is a railway station located in the city of Mishima, Shizuoka Prefecture, Japan operated by the private railroad company Izuhakone Railway.

Lines
Mishima-Hirokōji Station is served by the Sunzu Line, and is located 1.3 kilometers from the starting point of the line at Mishima Station.

Station layout
The station has one side platform serving a single track. The station building is staffed.

History 
Mishima-Hirokōji Station was opened on April 18, 1928. Located in downtown Mishima, it is primarily used by commuter traffic, except during the annual Mishima Matsuri.

Passenger statistics
In fiscal 2017, the station was used by an average of 1953 passengers daily (boarding passengers only).

Surrounding area
Izu Kokubun-ji ruins

See also
 List of Railway Stations in Japan

References

External links

 Official home page

Railway stations in Japan opened in 1928
Railway stations in Shizuoka Prefecture
Izuhakone Sunzu Line
Mishima, Shizuoka